The Lost Children is a B-sides compilation album by American heavy metal band Disturbed. It was released on November 8, 2011. The album was announced in August 2011 by David Draiman via Twitter, where he answered several questions regarding the album.

Background
The title comes from the band calling the songs "their children", because they can't pick a favorite. The Lost Children features all of Disturbed's B-side tracks that were recorded during a time period of 11 years with the exception of the song "Glass Shatters" which is only available on WWF Forceable Entry. The only song on the album not previously available is "Mine". A track titled "3", which was originally released as a digital single on the band's website for a campaign backing the West Memphis Three, was not originally intended to be released on the album but was included due to a surprise hearing for the West Memphis Three, resulting in their release from prison. The album artwork was revealed on September 22, 2011. "Hell" was announced as the first radio single for the album.

Songs
According to David Draiman, the album's first single, "Hell", is "about a relationship with someone who keeps coming in and out of your life, and every time they come back they fuck up your whole world." The track "Mine" is about religion as a catalyst for war.

Critical reception

The first online review of The Lost Children was posted by the website Artistdirect, and Rick Florino had given the album a positive review. Florino states about the album, "One of the reasons why Disturbed stood out from the turn of the century pack is because they've always been as diverse as they are dangerous in their approach. The band wasn't afraid to take risks, while crafting pulse-pounding, arena-filling heavy metal. The Lost Children screams that loud and clear." Revolver also reviewed the album and gave it a 4 out of 5, saying "Granted, it is a collection of B-sides, but any lack of overall cohesiveness or structure makes this album an enjoyably random pile of 16 good-to-great songs that force the listener to pick through and find their favorite."

Commercial performance
In the United States, the album debuted at No. 13 on the Billboard 200 chart with 43,000 copies sold, according to Nielsen SoundScan. The album has sold 238,000 copies in the United States as of July 2015.

Track listing

Personnel
Disturbed
David Draiman – lead vocals
Dan Donegan – guitar, keyboards
John Moyer – bass, backing vocals
Mike Wengren – drums, percussion
Steve Kmak – bass 

Production
Johnny K – producer , mixing 
Disturbed – producers 
Dan Donegan – producer 
David Draiman – producer 
Mike Wengren – producer 
Ben Grosse – mixing 
Neal Avron – mixing 
Ted Jensen – mastering
Travis Shinn – photography 
Raymond Swanland – illustration
Denny Phillips – design
Frank Maddocks – creative direction
 Norman Wonderly – creative direction

Chart positions

References

2011 compilation albums
Albums produced by Johnny K
Disturbed (band) albums
Reprise Records compilation albums
B-side compilation albums